Woodmen Hall is an historic Woodmen of the World building located on the corner of Center and Second streets in Saint Onge, Lawrence County, South Dakota. It was used as a meeting hall for the local Woodmen of the World lodge and other local organizations. It also housed a general store.

In 1991 it was added to the National Register of Historic Places, at which time it was vacant.

References

External links
 Image in Flickr

Buildings and structures in Lawrence County, South Dakota
Clubhouses on the National Register of Historic Places in South Dakota
Buildings designated early commercial in the National Register of Historic Places
Woodmen of the World buildings
National Register of Historic Places in Lawrence County, South Dakota
Unused buildings in South Dakota